Aleksei Fyodorovich Sazonov (born 21 July 1992) is a Russian former professional football player.

Club career
He made his Russian Premier League debut for FC Tom Tomsk on 12 March 2012 in a game against FC Volga Nizhny Novgorod.

References

External links
 

1992 births
Living people
Russian footballers
Russian Premier League players
FC Tom Tomsk players
Sportspeople from Tomsk
FC Tekstilshchik Ivanovo players
Association football forwards
FC Nosta Novotroitsk players